George M. Verity is a historic towboat now displayed as a museum ship in Keokuk, Iowa. Built in 1927 as SS Thorpe, she is nationally significant for being one of only three surviving steam-powered towboats in existence in the United States.  She was declared a National Historic Landmark in 1989.

Description and history
She has a scow-form bow and a keelless flat bottom. Its internal structure involves a then-experimental truss system to support the weight of heavy components, including the boilers and engines.

Verity was built in 1927 at Dubuque, Iowa for the Inland Waterways Corporation, an arm of the United States Government, as SS Thorpe, as one of four towboats that inaugurated barge service on the upper Mississippi River. She was the first to move barges from St. Louis north to St. Paul. She remained in service there until 1940, when she was sold to Armco Steel Corp. and put in service on the Ohio River. Armco renamed her after their founder, George M. Verity.

In 1960, George M. Verity was retired after 33 years of service on the Mississippi and Ohio Rivers, and in 1961, the boat was given to the City of Keokuk for use as a river museum.  The museum opened in 1962, with the boat installed in a permanent drydock facility.  Now berthed in Victory Park, she houses the George M. Verity River Museum of Upper Mississippi River history, and is open daily 9:00 AM – 5:00 PM, April to November.

See also
List of National Historic Landmarks in Iowa
National Register of Historic Places listings in Lee County, Iowa

References

External links
 George M. Verity River Museum

National Historic Landmarks in Iowa
Towboats
Museums in Lee County, Iowa
National Register of Historic Places in Lee County, Iowa
Ships on the National Register of Historic Places in Iowa
Museum ships in Iowa
1927 ships
Buildings and structures in Keokuk, Iowa